Fugui is an atonal pinyin romanization of various Chinese names and words.

It may refer to:

Places
 Cape Fugui (富貴), the northernmost point on Taiwan in Shimen District, New Taipei City
 Cape Fugui Lighthouse in Shimen District, New Taipei City
 Fugui Railway Station (富貴) in Hengshan, a town in Hsinchu County on Taiwan

People
 Xu Fugui (福貴), the protagonist of the novel To Live and the 1994 film adaptation To Live
 Fugui (福貴), the protagonist of the CCTV series Magic Boy Kitchener
 John Moffat Fugui, a politician in the Solomon Islands